Stranger than Fiction is an album by English saxophonist John Surman featuring John Taylor, Chris Laurence and John Marshall recorded in 1993 and released on the ECM label.

Reception
The Allmusic review by Scott Yanow awarded the album 4 stars, stating, "Surman always sounds relaxed, even on the more heated originals. It's an interesting set of generally introverted music".

Track listing
All compositions by John Surman except where noted.

 "Canticle with Response" – 6:10
 "A Distant Spring" – 7:45
 "Tess" – 6:44
 "Promising Horizons" (Marshall, Surman, Taylor) – 5:32
 "Across the Bridge" – 7:55
 "Moonshine Dancer" – 6:43
 "Running Sands" – 9:10
 "Triptych: Hidden Orchid/Synapsis/Paratactic Paths" – 14:43

Personnel
John Surman – soprano saxophone, baritone saxophone, alto clarinet, bass clarinet
John Taylor – piano
Chris Laurence – bass
John Marshall – drums

References

ECM Records albums
John Surman albums
1994 albums
Albums produced by Manfred Eicher